Śūnyatā is an element in Buddhist philosophy.

Sunyata may also refer to:

 Sunyata (Robert Rich album), a debut album by Robert Rich
 Sunyata (VAS album), a debut album by Vas
 Alfred Sorensen (1890 – 1984) also known as Sunyata, Danish mystic, horticulturalist and writer

See also
 Shoonya, 2006 Bollywood film written and directed by Arindam Mitra, co-written by Anurag Kashyap
 List of Buddhist topics